Abigail M. Carmichael is a fictional character on the TV drama Law & Order created by René Balcer and portrayed by model/actress Angie Harmon. The character was regularly featured from 1998 to 2001. She appeared in 78 episodes (72 episodes of Law & Order, and six episodes of Law & Order: Special Victims Unit).

In Law & Order
Abbie Carmichael is introduced in the episode "Cherished", having transferred from the Narcotics Bureau to replace Jamie Ross (Carey Lowell) as Jack McCoy's (Sam Waterston) assistant DA in the New York County DA's office. The series reveals that she is from Dallas and attended the University of Texas, where she was on the track team.

Carmichael is characterized as a staunch political conservative: She is anti-abortion, opposes gun control, favors the death penalty, and has no faith in criminal rehabilitation programs. These political beliefs often put her in conflict with McCoy and DAs Adam Schiff (Steven Hill) and Nora Lewin (Dianne Wiest), all of whom are of a more liberal stripe.

Certain cases affect her worldview, however. During one case (Season 9, Episode 8 "Punk"), she prosecutes an incarcerated woman who had murdered a corrections officer she claims had forced her into a sexual relationship. Carmichael, who had prosecuted the woman before on a drug charge, has no sympathy for her and seems hell-bent on putting her in prison for life—until she cross-examines the woman, who reveals that she blames herself for being raped. This strikes a chord in Carmichael, who suddenly arranges a lenient plea bargain for the woman. Carmichael later reveals to McCoy that she had been raped as a freshman in college by a third-year law student she had been dating, and had for years blamed herself. In another case, her friend and fellow ADA, Toni Ricci (Jenna Stern), is murdered by the Russian mobsters she was prosecuting. It is the only time that she lets anyone in the DA's office see her cry.

Carmichael makes her final appearance in the episode "Deep Vote", as she accepts an offer to join the U.S. Attorney's office in New York. She is replaced by Serena Southerlyn (Elisabeth Röhm) in season 12.

In Law & Order spinoffs
Carmichael also appeared in six episodes of the first season of the spinoff series Law & Order: Special Victims Unit: "Payback", "A Single Life", "Sophomore Jinx", "Closure", "Bad Blood" and "Entitled". She was the show's first assisting district attorney character, but on a recurring basis before being replaced by permanent ADA character Alexandra Cabot (Stephanie March) in Season 2.

Behind the scenes
Despite describing Abbie Carmichael as a "great character", Harmon nonetheless was frustrated with the fact that her shooting schedule on the show caused her to miss out on roles in the films Charlie's Angels and Spy Kids. Additionally, she felt that the character "didn't grow".  Harmon asked producer Dick Wolf to kill off the Carmichael character in a dramatic fashion a la Claire Kincaid (Jill Hennessy), but he refused.

Credits 
Harmon has been credited in a total of 78 episodes of the Law & Order franchise – 72 of Law & Order and 6 episodes of Law & Order: Special Victims Unit.

References

Law & Order characters
Law & Order: Special Victims Unit characters
Fictional assistant district attorneys
Fictional American lawyers
Fictional Republicans (United States)
Fictional characters from Texas
Television characters introduced in 1998
Crossover characters in television
American female characters in television
Fictional victims of sexual assault